Point of care medical information summaries are defined as "web-based medical compendia specifically designed to deliver predigested, rapidly accessible, comprehensive, periodically updated, and evidence-based information" to healthcare providers.

Products 
DynaMed
UpToDate

See also 
Clinical decision support system

References 

Evidence-based medicine
Medical databases

Medical websites
Online databases
Health informatics